Fuhu Temple (Chinese: 伏虎寺; pinyin: Fúhǔ Sì) is an ancient Buddhist temple located in the foothills of Mount Emei in Sichuan Province, China. It has been a Provincial-Level Protected Cultural Relic of Sichuan Province since 2002, and a Nationally Protected Key Cultural Site of China since 2006.

The temple is built at the confluence of two rivers: the Yoga River (瑜伽河) and Tiger Creek (虎溪). It is close to Baoguo Temple.

History
The temple was first built during the Tang dynasty. During the Song dynasty, the temple was expanded. At the beginning of the Qing dynasty ( 1644), the temple was destroyed. Starting in 1651, a group of disciples rebuilt the temple over approximately twenty years. The current temple has thirteen halls and approximately 20,000 square meters. There is a gate, nave, main hall, library, and dormitories for monks.

In 1995, the Arhat Hall of the temple was rebuilt.

Gallery

References

Buddhist temples in Sichuan
Major National Historical and Cultural Sites in Sichuan